The Emily Rockwell Love House is a historic home located in the Country Club District of Kansas City, Missouri. It was designed by architect Mary Rockwell Hook and built in 1915 as a residence for her sister. It is built on a slope, the house includes three levels. Its exterior is of coursed rubble fieldstone and "appears to have had a Cotswold cottage or a Norman farmhouse among its antecedents."

It was listed in the National Register of Historic Places in 2003.

References

Houses on the National Register of Historic Places in Missouri
Houses completed in 1915
Houses in Kansas City, Missouri
National Register of Historic Places in Kansas City, Missouri